Derrick Norman Lehmer (27 July 1867 – 8 September 1938) was an American mathematician and number theorist.

Education
He was educated at the University of Nebraska, obtaining a bachelor's degree in 1893 and master's in 1896. Lehmer was awarded his Ph.D. from the University of Chicago in 1900 for a thesis Asymptotic Evaluation of Certain Totient-Sums under the supervision of E. H. Moore.

Career
He was appointed instructor in mathematics at the University of California, Berkeley in 1900 and married Clara Eunice Mitchell on 12 July 1900 in Decatur, Illinois.  He was promoted to professor at Berkeley in 1918 and continued to teach there until retiring in 1937.

In 1903, he presented a factorization of Jevons's number (8,616,460,799) at the San Francisco Section of the American Mathematical Society, December 19, 1903.

He published tables of prime numbers and prime factorizations, reaching 10,017,000 by 1909. He developed a variety of mechanical and electro-mechanical factoring and computational devices, such as the Lehmer sieve, built with his son Derrick Henry Lehmer.

Selected works

Notes

References
 Albert H. Beiler, Recreations in the theory of numbers, Dover, 1964; chap.XX

External links
 
 
 
 

1867 births
1938 deaths
19th-century American mathematicians
20th-century American mathematicians
Number theorists
University of Nebraska–Lincoln alumni
University of Chicago alumni
University of California, Berkeley College of Letters and Science faculty